The Diocese of Anadyr (Анадырская епархия) is a diocese of the Russian Orthodox Church, the centralized religious organization headed by Moscow Patriarchate.  The diocese operates churches within the borders of the Chukotka Autonomous Okrug.

The cathedral church and the official seat of a diocesan bishop are located in the town of Anadyr.

History
The Anadyr diocese of the Russian Orthodox Church was founded by the resolution of the Holy Synod of the Russian Orthodox Church on 19 July 2000, by separating parishes in the territory of the Chukotka Autonomous Okrug from the Eparchy of Magadan.

Bishops 
Diomid (Dzyuban) (9 August 2000 - 28 June 2008)
Mark (Tuzhikov) (28 June 2008 - 31 March 2009) acting, archbishop of Khabarovsk
Nikodim (Chibisov) (31 March 2009 - 30 May 2011)
Seraphim (Glushakov) (30 May 2011 - 24 December 2015, acting from 24 December 2015 - 3 January 2016)
Matthew (Kopylov) (3 January 2016 - 14 July 2018, acting from 14 July - 21 August 2018)
Ipaty (Golubev) (since 21 August 2018)

See also 

 Russian Orthodox Church
 Eparchies and Metropolitanates of the Russian Orthodox Church

References

Anadyr
Eastern Orthodox dioceses in Russia